Gio or GIO may refer to:

People
 Gio (nickname)
 Gio (footballer, born 1984), Spanish
 Gio (singer) (born 1990)
 Gio people, an ethnic group in northeastern Liberia and Côte d'Ivoire

Science and technology
 Gi/o, protein subunits
 GIO, a computer bus
 GIO (software), a library for accessing virtual file-systems
 11084 Giò, a main belt asteroid
 Gibioctet, a unit of digital information
 Glucocorticoid-induced osteoporosis
 Samsung Galaxy Gio, a mobile telephone

Other
 Gío, a parish in Asturias, Spain
 Gio (Black Clover), a character in the manga series Black Clover
 GIO General, an Australian insurance company
 Giò lụa, a Vietnamese pork sausage
 Gio Ponti (horse), an American Thoroughbred race horse
 Ibanez GIO, a series of guitars
 General Inspection Office (Iran)
 Government Information Office, a former agency of the Republic of China (Taiwan)
 Dan language or Gio, spoken by the Gio people

See also
 Geo (disambiguation)